The Fullerian Chairs at the Royal Institution in London, England, were established by John 'Mad Jack' Fuller.

Fullerian Professors of Chemistry
 1833 Michael Faraday
 1868 William Odling
 1874 John Hall Gladstone
 1877 James Dewar
 1923 William Henry Bragg
 1942 Henry H. Dale
 1946 Eric Keightley Rideal
 1950 Edward Neville da Costa Andrade
 1953 William Lawrence Bragg
 1966 George Porter
 1988 John Meurig Thomas
 1994 Peter Day

References

Bibliography
 

Fullerian
Lists of office-holders in London
Royal Institution
Lists of scientists by membership
Chemistry, Fullerian